Myromeus is a genus of beetles in the family Cerambycidae, containing the following species:

 Myromeus fulvonotatus (Fisher, 1925)
 Myromeus gilmouri Breuning, 1962
 Myromeus immaculicollis Heller, 1924
 Myromeus luzonicus Fisher, 1925
 Myromeus subpictus Pascoe, 1864

References

Acanthocinini